The 1958 Lafayette Leopards baseball team represented Lafayette College in the 1958 NCAA University Division baseball season. The Leopards played their home games at Fisher Field. The team was coached by Charlie Gelbert in his 13th year at Lafayette.

The Leopards won the District II Playoff to advanced to the College World Series, where they were defeated by the Western Michigan Broncos.

Roster

Schedule 

! style="" | Regular Season
|- valign="top" 

|- align="center" bgcolor="#ffcccc"
| 1 || April 1 || at  || Ernie Shore Stadium • Winston-Salem, North Carolina || 7–13 || 0–1
|- align="center" bgcolor="#ffcccc"
| 2 || April 1 || vs  || Ernie Shore Stadium • Winston-Salem, North Carolina || 3–5 || 0–2
|- align="center" bgcolor="#ccffcc"
| 3 || April 2 || vs  || Ernie Shore Stadium • Winston-Salem, North Carolina || 6–1 || 1–2
|- align="center" bgcolor="#ccffcc"
| 4 || April 4 || at Quantico Marines || Unknown • Quantico, Virginia || 2–1 || 2–2
|- align="center" bgcolor="#ccffcc"
| 5 || April 5 || at  || Unknown • Washington, D.C. || 16–4 || 3–2
|- align="center" bgcolor="#ccffcc"
| 6 || April 9 || at  || Unknown • Annapolis, Maryland || 7–0 || 4–2
|- align="center" bgcolor="#ccffcc"
| 7 || April 10 ||  || Fisher Field • Easton, Pennsylvania || 17–7 || 5–2
|- align="center" bgcolor="#ccffcc"
| 8 || April 14 ||  || Fisher Field • Easton, Pennsylvania || 7–2 || 6–2
|- align="center" bgcolor="#ccffcc"
| 9 || April 16 || at  || Unknown • Philadelphia, Pennsylvania || 7–0 || 7–2
|- align="center" bgcolor="#ccffcc"
| 10 || April 18 || at  || Unknown • Lewisburg, Pennsylvania || 10–2 || 8–2
|- align="center" bgcolor="#ccffcc"
| 11 || April 19 ||  || Fisher Field • Easton, Pennsylvania || 3–2 || 9–2
|- align="center" bgcolor="#ccffcc"
| 12 || April 21 ||  || Fisher Field • Easton, Pennsylvania || 10–1 || 10–2
|- align="center" bgcolor="#ccffcc"
| 13 || April 23 || at  || Unknown • Gettysburg, Pennsylvania || 6–5 || 11–2
|- align="center" bgcolor="#ffcccc"
| 14 || April 25 || at  || Unknown • Philadelphia, Pennsylvania || 5–10 || 11–3
|- align="center" bgcolor="#ccffcc"
| 15 || April 26 ||  || Fisher Field • Easton, Pennsylvania || 7–0 || 12–3
|- align="center" bgcolor="#ccffcc"
| 16 || April 29 || at  || Unknown • Swarthmore, Pennsylvania || 17–7 || 13–3
|-

|- align="center" bgcolor="#ffcccc"
| 17 || May 1 || at  || Unknown • Newark, Delaware || 3–4 || 13–4
|- align="center" bgcolor="#ccffcc"
| 18 || May 10 ||  || Fisher Field • Easton, Pennsylvania || 5–0 || 14–4
|- align="center" bgcolor="#ccffcc"
| 19 || May 12 ||  || Fisher Field • Easton, Pennsylvania || 8–2 || 15–4
|- align="center" bgcolor="#ffcccc"
| 20 || May 14 || at Rutgers || Bainton Field • Piscataway, New Jersey || 8–9 || 15–5
|- align="center" bgcolor="#ccffcc"
| 21 || May 17 || at  || New Beaver Field • University Park, Pennsylvania || 8–7 || 16–5
|- align="center" bgcolor="#ffcccc"
| 22 || May 23 || Delaware || Fisher Field • Easton, Pennsylvania || 6–9 || 16–6
|- align="center" bgcolor="#ffcccc"
| 23 || May 24 ||  || Fisher Field • Easton, Pennsylvania || 1–2 || 16–7
|-

|-
|-
! style="" | Postseason
|- valign="top"

|- align="center" bgcolor="#ccffcc"
| 24 || May 29 || vs Penn State || Unknown • Philadelphia, Pennsylvania || 9–1 || 17–7
|- align="center" bgcolor="#ccffcc"
| 25 || May 30 || vs  || Unknown • Philadelphia, Pennsylvania || 5–1 || 18–7
|-

|- align="center" bgcolor="#ccffcc"
| 26 || May 31 ||  || Fisher Field • Easton, Pennsylvania || 6–5 || 19–7
|- align="center" bgcolor="#ffcccc"
| 27 || May 29 || vs Fort Dix || Fisher Field • Easton, Pennsylvania || 7–10 || 19–8
|-

|- align="center" bgcolor="#ffcccc"
| 28 || June 14 || vs Colorado State College || Omaha Municipal Stadium • Omaha, Nebraska || 5–10 || 19–9
|- align="center" bgcolor="#ffcccc"
| 29 || June 15 || vs Western Michigan || Omaha Municipal Stadium • Omaha, Nebraska || 3–4 || 19–10
|-

References 

Lafayette Leopards baseball seasons
Lafayette Leopards baseball
College World Series seasons
Lafayette Leopards